Hand Hills-Acadia was a provincial electoral district in Alberta, Canada, mandated to return a single member to the Legislative Assembly of Alberta using the first-past-the-post method of voting from 1963 to 1971. It was formed prior to the 1963 Alberta general election from the previous electoral district of Hand Hills.

The electoral district took its name from Hand Hills.

Members of the Legislative Assembly (MLAs)

Election results

1963 general election

1967 general election

See also
List of Alberta provincial electoral districts
Hand Hills, a range of hills in Alberta
Acadia, Alberta, a rural municipality in Alberta

References

Further reading

External links
Elections Alberta
The Legislative Assembly of Alberta

Former provincial electoral districts of Alberta